The 1949 NFL Championship Game was the 17th title game for the National Football League (NFL), played on December 18 at the Los Angeles Memorial Coliseum in Los Angeles, California. It is remembered for the driving rain that caused the field to become a mud pit.  Its paid attendance was 27,980, with only 22,245 in the stadium, which would be a low in attendance not reached until 2020, which drew 24,835 because of global pandemic restrictions.

The game featured the Eastern Division champion Philadelphia Eagles (11–1), the defending NFL champions, against the Los Angeles Rams (8–2–2), winners of the Western Division. This was the first NFL title game played in the western United States. The Rams had last appeared in a title game in 1945, a victory and the franchise's final game in Cleveland.

The Eagles were favored by a touchdown, and won 14–0 for their second consecutive shutout in the title game. Running back Steve Van Buren rushed for 196 yards on 31 carries for the Eagles and their defense held the Rams to just 21 yards on the ground.

Philadelphia head coach Earle "Greasy" Neale did not like to fly, so the Eagles traveled to the West Coast by train. On the way west, they stopped in Illinois for a workout at Stagg Field at the University of Chicago on Wednesday morning.

Scoring summary
Sunday, December 18, 1949
Kickoff: 1:30 p.m. PST

First quarter
no scoring
Second quarter
PHI - Pete Pihos 31-yard pass from Tommy Thompson (Cliff Patton kick) 7–0 PHI
Third quarter
PHI - Leo Skladany 2-yard block punt return (Patton kick) 14–0 PHI
Fourth quarter
no scoring

Officials

Referee: Ron Gibbs
Umpire: Joseph Crowley
Head Linesman: Charlie Berry
Back Judge: Robert Austin
Field Judge: William McHugh 

Alternate: Rawson Bowen
Alternate: Cletus Gardner 

Players' shares
The Eagles players earned $1,090 each and the Rams got $789, about one-third of what was expected with fair weather. Anticipating 70,000 or more in attendance and a large payoff from the gate, the players and owners wanted to postpone the game for a week, but were overridden by Commissioner Bert Bell, reached at home in Philadelphia.

Ticket prices were five dollars between the goal lines and $3.60 elsewhere.

Television
This was the first NFL game which was broadcast on television, although only on the West Coast, under the auspices of Bell. The traditional 60–40 player bonus for playing in a championship game was augmented by $14,000 (presently, $) from the NFL. Although sources are unclear, a source writes the NFL received $20,000 (presently, $) from the broadcasting rights.

Sources
 Lyons, Robert S. (2010). On Any Given Sunday, A Life of Bert Bell. Philadelphia: Temple University Press. 978-1-59213-731-2
 Coenen, Craig R. (2005). From Sandlots to the Super Bowl: The National Football League, 1920–1967. Knoxville, TN: The University of Tennessee Press.

References

External links
 1949 NFL Championship Game

Championship Game, 1949
National Football League Championship games
Los Angeles Rams postseason
Philadelphia Eagles postseason
NFL Championship
NFL Championship
1949 in Los Angeles
American football competitions in Los Angeles